Jana Brunner (born 20 January 1997) is a Swiss footballer who plays for Basel and the Switzerland national team.

She played for Switzerland at UEFA Women's Euro 2017.

References

External links
 

1997 births
Living people
Swiss women's footballers
Switzerland women's international footballers
Women's association football defenders
FC Basel Frauen players
Swiss Women's Super League players
UEFA Women's Euro 2017 players